Hsu Shu-hsiang (born 22 April 1961) is a Taiwanese academic administrator and politician.

Hsu Shu-hsiang is the elder son of Hsu Wen-tsu. His younger brother Hsu Shu-po has served on the Legislative Yuan. Hsu Shu-hsiang graduated from Soochow University with a degree in political science, and pursued graduate study in the same subject in the United States, earning a master's degree at Ohio State University and a doctorate at Colorado State University. Hsu has headed the educational institution TransWorld University twice, and overseen it through three name changes. Hsu took office as Minister of Examination on 1 October 2019.

References

1961 births
Living people
Taiwanese expatriates in the United States
Presidents of universities and colleges in Taiwan
Ohio State University alumni
Colorado State University alumni
Soochow University (Taiwan) alumni
21st-century Taiwanese politicians
Members of the Examination Yuan